Thomas Denver Jonsson (real name Thomas Jonsson) (born 1979) is an artist of the Swedish indie/folk underground scene. With an expression equally from the contemporary scene (M. Ward, Cat Power, Bright Eyes) and the songsmiths' golden era (Roy Orbison, Johnny Cash, Bob Dylan).

Has toured extensively in Europe and a few appearances in US. Has done a number of albums and collaborations (with artists such as Jennie Stearns, Rosie Thomas, Damien Jurado, Ned Oldham, Bobby Baby, Dear Euphoria and C-J Larsgarden). He's currently working on his 6th solo album Transit.

Discography 
(solo albums and side projects)
2014 : I'm Kingfisher - Avian (Kite/Playground Music)
2010 : I'm Kingfisher - Arctic (Playground Music)
2007 : Thomas Denver Jonsson - The Lake Acts Like An Ocean (Kite)
2007 : A Perfect Friend - S/t (STILLL)
2005 : Thomas Denver Jonsson - Barely Touching It (Kite)
2004 : Thomas Denver Jonsson - First in Line EP (Kite)
2003 : Thomas Denver Jonsson - Hope to Her (Kite)
2003 : Topeka Twins - I never heard her sing 7" (Kite)
2003 : Thomas Denver Jonsson - Then I Kissed Her Softly 7" (Kite)

Sources 
 Thomas Denver Jonsson @ Allmusic 
http://www.thomasdenver.com Official Website
http://www.thomasdenver.com/e-pic.htm  Mp3 Downloads (album tracks & demos)

Living people
1979 births
Swedish folk musicians
Swedish indie rock musicians